Justice Swan may refer to:

Gustavus Swan, associate justice of the Ohio Supreme Court
Joseph Rockwell Swan (politician), associate justice of the Ohio Supreme Court